Robert Närska (born 21 September 1948 in Tartu) is an Estonian economist and politician.

In 1992, he was Minister of the Interior.

References

Living people
1948 births
20th-century Estonian economists
Estonian Coalition Party politicians
Estonian Centre Party politicians
Conservative People's Party of Estonia politicians
Government ministers of Estonia
Politicians from Tartu